People's Communist Party of Turkey (HTKP) was a communist party in Turkey founded in 2014.

Formation
Following a period of internal strife within the Communist Party of Turkey (TKP), the party decided to split in two. The faction led by Erkan Baş and Metin Çulhaoğlu founded the People's Communist Party of Turkey on 13 July 2014, with the other faction forming the Communist Party (KP). On 15 July 2014, the two rival factions reached a consensus to freeze the activities of the former party and that neither faction shall use the name and emblem of TKP. The TKP has since been re-established.

References

2014 establishments in Turkey
2017 disestablishments in Turkey
Defunct communist parties in Turkey
Far-left politics in Turkey
Political parties disestablished in 2017
Political parties established in 2014